Palackattumala is a  village in Kottayam District of Kerala, India with a population of around 1500.  An oblong tableland located on a small rolling hill, north of Illickal Junction in Pala – Vaikom road. The nearest town is Palai.

Landmarks
Palackattumala have two lower primary schools, one pre-school, public library, RPS, post office, temple, church, two convents, and few shops.

Etymology
"Palackattumala" name originated either from  "a place near Palai, with forest and hill", or from "A hilly, forest with a lot of pala trees",  abundant in the region in the past.

Geography
Like many other places in the midlands of Kerala, Palackattumala is located over a small rolling hill.

Economy
People in this village depends on agriculture, with rubber, coconut, cocoa, pepper, tamarind, ginger, tapioca, pineapple and banana being the main crops. Other spices include clove, vanilla and nutmeg. Also in abundance are papaya, jackfruit, mango trees,  and arrowroot. In the past Palackattumala had large paddy fields, water shortage, and the geography of Palackattumala makes it  uneconomical. These fields are now converted to rubber plantations. Many people in the village have paddy fields in nearby valavoor and Andoor areas. This village has a few granite quarries and a few rubber related small scale businesses including GUMEX . A sizable number of its population is working abroad or in other states of India. Like most other places in the Central Travancore region, its economy is heavily dependent on rubber cultivation.

Local administration
Palackattumala is divided into two Gram-panchayath wards. wards V -Irumugham and VI-Palackattumala, of Marangattupilly Gram Panchayat. For the previous  term September 2015 – 2020 both these wards are represented by Martin Augustine  and Mathukutty George  respectively. Currently  both these wards ( September 2010 – 2015 and again in 2020–2025) were reserved for women and is/was represented by Praseeda Sajeev and Nirmala Divakaran, respectively. Palackattumala is part of Marangattupilly ward in Uzhavoor Block Panchayat. For revenue administration purpose Palackattumala is under Kurichithanam revenue village and belongs to  Meenachil Thaluk. Palackattumala is part of Kaduthuruthy Legislative Constituency and Kottayam Lok-Sabha Constituency.

Post and Telecommunications
BSNL provides landline-telephone and broadband internet services in Palackattumala through its Marangattupilly and Valavoor Exchanges. 2G,3G and 4G-Mobile phone networks of all the major mobile service providers are available, though not ubiquitous. From 2017 fibre to home for internet is available from local cable operator. Electricity distribution is by state owned monopoly KSEB. Palackattumala had a history of severe water shortage during summer. Now some parts of Palackattumala have access to water supply, provided by a cooperative society with support from the water authority and also by the Marangattupilly Grama Panchayath. Palackattumala post office located in Illickal Junction.

Places of worship

Narasimha Swamy Temple
This Hindu temple is believed to be of 1000 years old. This temple is now governed by the Travancore Devaswom Board, is one of the 108 Temples devoted to Lord Narasimha in Kerala. Temple Festival is a week long and is usually in the last week of December or first week of January.

Moothedath Kavu Bhagavathy Temple
The Moothedath Kavu Bhagavathy is a very old temple in Palackattumala, belonging to the Moothedathu family.

Mother Of Perpetual Help Church
Syrian Catholic Church, under Pala Diocese]. Palackattumala church  established as a kurishu pally on 24 May 1959 to Marangattupilly St. Francis Church, becomes a parish on 2 May 1971.  Church Feast on the second week of January. As of 2010, Palackattumala Parish have 166 families with 1050 members.

Palackattumala Kurishupally
Officiated on 15 January 1984 by the Bishop of Palai diocese Mar Joseph Pallickapparambil. This minor church is located in Nedumpara on land donated by the Kulangara family.

Schools
Palackattumala has two of the oldest lower primary schools in the region. Students attend high school in Marangattupilly St. Thomas H.S. or Kudakkachira St. Joseph's H.S. For higher education, St. Thomas College, Alphonsa College Pala, St. Stephan's College Uzhavoor, Deva Matha College Kuravilangad under Mahatma Gandhi University Kottayam.

St. Marys L. P. School
St. Marys lower primary school is a government aided institution managed by the Sisters of the Destitute. This Malayalam medium institution offers education to students in the Palackattumala region from  1st to 4th standard. Started in 1900 as a "Nilath ezhuth Kalari" (s pre-school which teaches kids alphabets by writing on sand), it became an L.P. School under the management of  Thazhathel Mathai Vorkey. This school is under Kuravilangad Educational Sub District. Aside from the primary school, there is one pre-primary (Nursery) school managed by the SD Convent.

Government. L.P. School Andoor
Govt. lower Primary School is Established in 1912 as a "KudiPallikkoodam", in a place donated by Pallat Nayar family in Illickal junction. Later the control of the school is transferred to the Govt of Travancore. This school is under Kuravilangad Educational Sub District, and directly managed by the government of Kerala.

Public library
Maranattupally panchayat community center and reading room, in Palackattumala started in 1951,  as  public library (Vaayanashala) with the grant from the GrandaShala Sangam (Library movement of Kerala) is now supported by Marangattupally Grama Panchayat, as a full-fledged community center. It contains a range of Malayalam books - novels, encyclopedia, dramas, poems - and newspapers. Library membership is open to the public with a very nominal membership fee. Vaayanashala serves as a local meeting place. Library also have a public TV, which serves as the common place to watch cricket and football matches.

Transportation
The Illickal-Palackattumala-Kudakkachira road passes through Palackattumala. Other major roads are Valavoor-Palackattumala Kurisupally Junction road, and Palackattumala-Andoor Road. Apart from that there are few minor roads to reach different places in Palackattumala.
Earlier Palackattumala was connected to Pala and Uzhavoor by KSRTC and private buses. The nearest bus stop is Illickal Junction about a kilometer from the heart of village, with buses in Palai-Vaikom route in every 15 minutes. The nearest railway station is Kottayam. Cochin international airport (CIAL) at Nedumbassery is the nearest airport.

Illickal Junction

This junction is the gateway to Palackattumala, is at a distance of 6 km from Palai in Vaikom Road. It has a bus stop for ordinary (LS) buses. illickal also have an auto stand and two general stationery stores. Govt. Lower primary school and Palackattumala Post Office are also in the vicinity. In 2011 as part of road modification curves at illickal junction of Pala-Vaikom road is straightened and the Bus stops of Kattuvetty and Illickal combined.

References

External links
Kaduthuruthy - School Code, Sub District Name of SchoolS

Villages in Kottayam district